The canton of Lacapelle-Marival is an administrative division of the Lot department, southern France. Its borders were modified at the French canton reorganisation which came into effect in March 2015. Its seat is in Lacapelle-Marival.

It consists of the following communes:
 
Anglars
Assier
Bessonies
Le Bourg
Le Bouyssou
Cardaillac
Espeyroux
Gorses
Issepts
Labastide-du-Haut-Mont
Labathude
Lacapelle-Marival
Latronquière
Lauresses
Livernon
Montet-et-Bouxal
Reyrevignes
Rudelle
Rueyres
Sabadel-Latronquière
Saint-Bressou
Saint-Cirgues
Sainte-Colombe
Saint-Hilaire
Saint-Maurice-en-Quercy
Saint-Médard-Nicourby
Saint-Simon
Sénaillac-Latronquière
Sonac
Terrou
Thémines
Théminettes

References

Cantons of Lot (department)